Ely Eel Day is an annual celebration observed by people from Ely, Cambridgeshire to celebrate the city's namesake — the eel. The celebrations start with a parade which begins from Cross Green outside Ely Cathedral and proceeds through the city to the Jubilee Gardens, passing by the Market Square and along the River Great Ouse at Ely's Waterside.

The celebrations following the parade include an eel throwing competition. The competition does not use real eels. Originally competitors were given socks rolled into some tights with rice in the end to weight it down but now the competition uses specially made toy eels. Other events on Eel Day include an annual competition for Town Criers.

Eel Day is traditionally held on the Saturday, of the May Bank Holiday weekend.

References

External links
Ely Eel Day Procession 2011 photographs
Ely Eel Day Procession 2012 photographs
Ely Eel Day 2012 photographs

April events
May events
Festivals in Cambridgeshire
Ely, Cambridgeshire
Eels